The Century Company was an American publishing company, founded in 1881.

History
It was originally a subsidiary of Charles Scribner's Sons, named Scribners and Company, but was bought by Roswell Smith and renamed by him after the Century Association.  The magazine that the company had published up to that time, Scribners Monthly, was renamed The Century Illustrated Monthly Magazine.

The Century Company was also the publisher of St. Nicholas Magazine from the time of its founding.

William Morgan Schuster became president of the Century Company of New York City in 1915 and held this position until 1933.

In 1933 the Century Company merged with publisher D. Appleton & Company to form Appleton-Century Company, and later Appleton-Century-Crofts.

Schuster became the president of Appleton-Century Crofts Inc. from 1933 until his retirement in 1952.

Imprints
 Century Vagabond Books

See also
 Century Dictionary
 Century type family
 Duell, Sloan and Pearce
 Meredith Publishing Company
 Theodore Low De Vinne

References

External links 

  History of the Century Company at New York Public Library

Publishing companies established in 1881
Defunct book publishing companies of the United States
1881 establishments in New York (state)